One Wonderful Night may refer to:
 One Wonderful Night (1914 film), an American silent mystery drama film
 One Wonderful Night (1922 film), an American silent mystery film